Gustaf Birch-Lindgren (1 October 1892 – 6 September 1969) was a Swedish architect. His work was part of the architecture event in the art competition at the 1932 Summer Olympics.

References

1892 births
1969 deaths
20th-century Swedish architects
Olympic competitors in art competitions
Artists from Stockholm